Frederick George Willoughby (25 April 1862 – 16 April 1952) was a Scottish born English first-class cricketer. Willoughby was a right-handed batsman who bowled left-arm medium pace.

Willoughby made his first-class debut for Hampshire in 1885 against Derbyshire. Willoughby made eight first-class appearance for Hampshire in that season, with his final first-class match coming against Kent. At the end of the 1885 season Hampshire lost their first-class status, bringing to an end Willoughby's first-class career. Willoughby, who played as a bowler, took 25 wickets at a bowling average of 22.56, with best figures of 4-39.

Willoughby continued to play for Hampshire in 1886, representing the county in seven non first-class matches. His final appearance for the club came against Hertfordshire.

From 1890 to 1894 Willoughby represented the county 27 times in non-competitive cricket. In 1895 Willoughby represented Worcestershire in the inaugural Minor Counties Championship in a single match against Hertfordshire.

Umpiring career
Willoughby stood as an Umpire in 5 Minor Counties matches in 1905. In 1906 Willoughby stood in 21 first-class matches during the 1906 County Championship.

Death
Willoughby died in Eastleigh, Hampshire on 16 April 1952.

External links
Frederick Willoughby at Cricinfo
Frederick Willoughby at CricketArchive

1862 births
1952 deaths
Cricketers from Edinburgh
English cricketers
Hampshire cricketers
Worcestershire cricketers
English cricket umpires